The Copper Creek Mine is a large copper mine located in Arizona, in the southwestern part of the United States. Copper Creek represents one of the largest copper reserves in the United States and in the world, having estimated reserves of 983.5 million tonnes of ore grading 0.2% copper.

References 

Copper mines in Arizona
Geography of Pinal County, Arizona